Wila Lluxita (Aymara wila red, blood, lluxi landslide, -ta a suffix, also spelled Wila Llojeta) is a mountain in the Cordillera Real in the Andes of Bolivia, about  high. It is situated in the La Paz Department, Murillo Province, La Paz Municipality, near the border with the Los Andes Province, Pucarani Municipality. Wila Lluxita lies south-west of the mountain Janq'u K'ark'a.

The river Wila Lluxita (Huila Llojeta) which later is called Sunqu (Zongo) originates south of the mountain. It flows to the east and then north-east.

References 

Mountains of La Paz Department (Bolivia)